Jacobus Duivenvoorde (November 15, 1928 – November 16, 2011) was the Catholic archbishop of the Roman Catholic Archdiocese of Merauke, Indonesia.

Ordained to the priesthood in 1954, Duivenvoorde was named a bishop in 1972, retiring in 2004.

He died on November 16, 2011 at the age of 83.

Notes

1928 births
2011 deaths
Indonesian Roman Catholic archbishops
Dutch emigrants to Indonesia